Scandinavian School in Madrid is an international school in La Moraleja, Alcobendas, Spain, in the Madrid metropolitan area. It serves students in preschool (förskola/educación infantil) until secondary school (gymnasium/bachillerato).

It was established on two campuses in Madrid in 1944. It moved to Alcobendas in 1973 and adopted its current name in 1982.

, 40 percent of the students had origins in the Nordic countries, and the students originated from about 15 countries. There are two sections: one that uses a Swedish curriculum and Swedish as a language of instruction, and one that uses the Cambridge curriculum and English as a language of instruction.

References

References
 Inspection Report The Scandinavian School, Madrid. The National Association of British Schools in Spain. Friday 20 March 2015.

External links
 Scandinavian School in Madrid
  Scandinavian School in Madrid
  Scandinavian School in Madrid

International schools in the Community of Madrid
Swedish international schools
1944 establishments in Spain
Educational institutions established in 1944